Leonardo Baima (born 5 October 1992) is an Argentine professional footballer who last played as a midfielder for the Richmond Kickers in USL League One. Besides Argentina, he has played in Croatia.

Career
Baima began his footballing career with Boca Juniors. He didn't appear competitively for the club, though was an unused substitute once during the 2012–13 Argentine Primera División season against Unión Santa Fe on 25 August 2012. In June 2013, Baima was loaned to Primera B Nacional's Aldosivi. He made his professional debut during a 3–0 defeat to San Martín on 4 August, prior to netting his first goal against Defensa y Justicia on 24 August. Baima left Boca Juniors permanently in January 2015, joining Defensores de Belgrano in Primera B Metropolitana. Seventy-nine games and five goals followed in three seasons.

On 14 February 2018, Baima completed a move to Croatian Second Football League side Dugopolje. His first appearance for the club arrived on 10 March versus Šibenik, while his final match came in a defeat to Lučko as Dugopolje finished sixth in 2017–18. Baima returned to Argentine football in July 2018 after he signed for Chacarita Juniors in Primera B Nacional.

Baima signed with USL League One club Richmond Kickers on 3 February 2022. At the end of the 2022 season, his contract option was declined by the Kickers.

Career statistics
.

References

External links

1992 births
Living people
Sportspeople from Santa Fe Province
Argentine footballers
Association football midfielders
Argentine expatriate footballers
Expatriate footballers in Croatia
Argentine expatriate sportspeople in Croatia
Primera Nacional players
Primera B Metropolitana players
First Football League (Croatia) players
Boca Juniors footballers
Aldosivi footballers
Defensores de Belgrano footballers
NK Dugopolje players
Chacarita Juniors footballers
Nueva Chicago footballers
Club Atlético Platense footballers
Central Norte players
Richmond Kickers players
Argentine expatriate sportspeople in the United States
Expatriate soccer players in the United States